Unified Memory Access is not a valid term, but is often used mistakenly when referring to:
Uniform Memory Access, a computer memory architecture used in parallel computers
Unified Memory Architecture, a technology that allows a graphics processing unit to share system memory